Nordkroken is a locality situated in Vänersborg Municipality, Västra Götaland County, Sweden with 423 inhabitants in 2010.

References 

Populated places in Vänersborg Municipality
Populated places in Västra Götaland County